Gabriele Bongiorni (born 16 May 1959 in Chignolo Po) is an Italian former footballer. Originally from the province of Pavia, he made his Serie A debut in the 1988–89 season with Ascoli.

Palmares
 Campionato Interregionale 1991/92 (Oltrepò)

External links
Profile 

1959 births
Living people
Italian footballers
Association football midfielders
Serie A players
U.S. Alessandria Calcio 1912 players
U.S. Catanzaro 1929 players
S.S.D. Varese Calcio players
U.S. Cremonese players
Sportspeople from the Province of Pavia
Ascoli Calcio 1898 F.C. players
A.C. Trento 1921 players
Footballers from Lombardy